Events in the year 1862 in Brazil.

Incumbents
Monarch – Pedro II.
Prime Minister – Marquis of Caxias (until 24 May, Zacarias de Góis e Vasconcelos (from 24 May to 30 May), Marquis of Olinda (starting 30 May).

Events

 Christie Question - British sailors were arrested in Rio de Janeiro for promoting mutinies.

Births

Deaths

References

 
1860s in Brazil
Years of the 19th century in Brazil
Brazil
Brazil